Archery, for the 2017 Island Games, held at the Rävhagen, Visby, Gotland, Sweden in June 2017.

The Isle of Man have confirmed they will be providing a squad of 9 in two teams.

Medal table

Results

Men's

Women's

Team

Mixed

References

Island
2017
Archery